M'Vengue El Hadj Omar Bongo Ondimba International Airport  is an airport serving the city of Franceville, Haut-Ogooué Province, Gabon.

Airlines and destinations

See also
 
 List of airports in Gabon
 Transport in Gabon

References

External links
 Mvengue Airport
 OurAirports - M'Vengue

Airports in Gabon